The Aeronauts may refer to:

 The Aeronauts (TV series), a French TV series
 The Aeronauts (film), a 2019 film